There are a number of Elementary schools named Grant Elementary School:

Grant Elementary School (Tacoma, Washington)
 Grant Elementary School (Eureka, California)
 Grant Elementary School (Petaluma, California)
 Grant Elementary School (San Diego, California)
 Grant Elementary School (Santa Ana, California)
 Grant Elementary School (Santa Monica, California)
 Grant Elementary School (Muscatine, Iowa) 
 Grant Elementary School (Columbia, Missouri)
 Grant Elementary School (Murray, Utah)